J. D. Dam Lake is located  south and east of Williams in North Central Arizona.

Fish Species

 Rainbow Trout

References

External links
Arizona Boating Locations Facilities Map
Arizona Fishing Locations Map
Video of J.D. Dam Lake

Lakes of Arizona
Lakes of Coconino County, Arizona